William XII of Auvergne (1300–1332) was Count of Auvergne and Count of Boulogne between 1325 and 1332. He was the eldest son of Robert VII of Auvergne and Blanche of Bourbon, daughter of Robert, Count of Clermont.

William married Margaret of Évreux (1307–1351), daughter of Louis, Count of Évreux and Margaret of Artois. William died in 1332.

William and Margaret had:
 Joan, his successor and Queen consort of France by her marriage to King John II.

References

Sources

Counts of Boulogne
Counts of Auvergne
1300 births
1332 deaths